Edward C. Jewell (1894–1963) was an American art director who worked on the sets of over a hundred and fifty film productions during his career. He worked for a variety of studios including Columbia Pictures in the 1930s and Producers Releasing Corporation in the 1940s, and along with Dave Milton he is one of the best known set designers for second features. Earlier in his career he was part of the design team which worked on Cecil B. DeMille's 1927 epic The King of Kings

Selected filmography

 The King of Kings (1927)
 His Dog (1927)
 Craig's Wife (1928)
 Captain Swagger (1928)
 Sal of Singapore (1928)
 Marked Money (1928)
 The Spieler (1928)
 Strange Cargo (1929)
 His First Command (1929)
 Oh, Yeah! (1929)
 The Flying Fool (1929)
 The Trespasser (1929)
 The Squealer (1930)
 Ladies Must Play (1930)
 Officer O'Brien (1930)
 Dirigible (1931)
 Ten Cents a Dance (1931)
 The Secrets of Wu Sin (1932)
 Rainbow Over Broadway (1933)
 By Appointment Only (1933)
 Goodbye Love (1933)
 On the Stroke of Nine  (1933)
 Fugitive Road (1934)
 False Pretenses (1935)
 The Lady in Scarlet (1935)
 Death from a Distance (1935)
 Murder at Glen Athol (1936)
 Ellis Island (1936)
 Battle of Greed (1937)
 Rebellious Daughters (1938)
 Commandos Strike at Dawn (1942)
 Good Luck, Mr. Yates (1943)
 Shadow of Terror (1945)
 Dangerous Intruder (1945)
Counter-Attack (1945)
 Secrets of a Sorority Girl (1945)
 God's Country (1946)
 Philo Vance's Secret Mission (1947)
 Lady at Midnight (1948)
 Gunfight at Comanche Creek (1963)

References

Bibliography
 Michael L. Stephens. Art Directors in Cinema: A Worldwide Biographical Dictionary. McFarland, 1998.

External links

1894 births
1963 deaths
American art directors
People from Pontiac, Michigan